Szilárd Kun (23 March 1935 – 31 August 1987) was a Hungarian sport shooter who competed in the 1952 Summer Olympics, in the 1956 Summer Olympics, in the 1964 Summer Olympics, in the 1968 Summer Olympics and in the 1972 Summer Olympics. He won a silver medal at the 1952 Games.

References

1935 births
1987 deaths
Hungarian male sport shooters
ISSF pistol shooters
Olympic shooters of Hungary
Shooters at the 1952 Summer Olympics
Shooters at the 1956 Summer Olympics
Shooters at the 1964 Summer Olympics
Shooters at the 1968 Summer Olympics
Shooters at the 1972 Summer Olympics
Olympic silver medalists for Hungary
Olympic medalists in shooting
Medalists at the 1952 Summer Olympics
Sport shooters from Budapest
20th-century Hungarian people